Family United is a 2013 Spanish comedy film directed by Daniel Sánchez Arévalo.

The film is an Atresmedia Cine (Mercedes Gamero), Atípica Films (José Antonio Félez) and MOD Producciones (Fernando Bovaira) production.

Cast 

 Antonio de la Torre as Adán
 Roberto Álamo as Benjamín
 Quim Gutiérrez as Caleb
  as Daniel
 Patrick Criado as Efraín
  as Padre
 Verónica Echegui as Cris
  as Carla
  as Mónica

References

External links 

2013 comedy films
2013 films
Films directed by Daniel Sánchez Arévalo
Spanish comedy films
Atresmedia Cine films
Atípica Films films
2010s Spanish films